WGNY-FM (98.9 FM) is a radio station broadcasting an oldies format. Licensed to Rosendale, New York, United States, the station serves the Poughkeepsie and Kingston areas. The station, which signed on in February 2011, is owned by Hawkeye Communications and operated by Sunrise Broadcasting Corporation, and features programming from ABC Radio. It also broadcasts in HD, and carries Dance "Drive FX" on its HD-2 channel. Its studios are in New Windsor, New York and its transmitter is in Esopus, New York.

References

External links
Official Website

GNY-FM
Oldies radio stations in the United States
Radio stations established in 2011
2011 establishments in New York (state)